CQ Camelopardalis, abbreviated as CQ Cam, is a solitary variable star in the northern circumpolar constellation Camelopardalis. It has an apparent magnitude of 5.19, making it visible to the naked eye under ideal conditions.

CQ Cam has a stellar classification of M0 II, indicating that it is a red bright giant. CQ Cam is currently on the asymptotic giant branch, fusing hydrogen and helium shells around an inert carbon core. At present it has 12.7 times the mass of the Sun but, at the age of 16 million years, it has expanded to 333 times the radius of the Sun. The object is a luminous star, with a bolometric luminosity over 10,000 times that of the Sun.

CQ Cam has been classified as a low amplitude slow irregular variable based on Hipparcos photometry. However, there have not been enough observations to confirm this.

References

Camelopardalis (constellation)
020797
015890
M-type bright giants
Camelopardalis, CQ
1009
Slow irregular variables
BD+64 00391
Runaway stars